Atanasov (Cyrillic: Атанасов), feminine Atanasova (Cyrillic:Атанасова), also transliterated as Atanassov/Atanassova, is a Bulgarian-language surname, derived from the name Atanas. Notable people with this surname include:

Alfredo Atanasof, Argentine politician, born 1949
Andrey Atanasov, Bulgarian footballer, 1987
Atanas Atanasov, runner, born 1945
Atanas Atanasov, Bulgarian long jumper, born 1956
Atanas Atanasov, Bulgarian footballer, born 1985
Chavdar Atanasov, Bulgarian footballer, born 1973
Dimo Atanasov, Bulgarian footballer, born 1985
Dimitar Atanasov (canoeist), Bulgarian sprint canoer
Doncho Atanasov, Bulgarian footballer, born 1983
Gavril Atanasov, 19th century Yugoslavian icon painter
Georgi Atanasov (composer), Bulgarian composer, 1882 – 1931
Georgi Atanasov (politician), Bulgarian politician and Prime Minister from 1986 - 1990
Hristo Atanassov (born 1965), Bulgarian politician
Hristo Atanasov (Dikanya), Bulgarian revolutionary, 1877 - 1908
John Vincent Atanasoff, American physicist and one of the inventors of the computer, 1903 - 1995.
Kosta Atanasov, a Bulgarian teacher and revolutionary, 1870 - 1912
Krassimir Atanassov (born 1954), Bulgarian mathematician
Manol Atanassov (born 1991), Bulgarian figure skater
Myléna Atanassova (born 1963), Bulgarian fashion designer and painter
Nikola Atanasov, Bulgarian revolutionary and politician, 1886 - 1945
Nikolay Atanasov, long jumper, born 1974
Petar Atanasov (footballer), Bulgarian footballer, born 1990
Petar Atanasov (linguist), Macedonian linguist, born 1939
Slavcho Atanasov, Bulgarian politician and mayor of Plovdiv, 2007 - 2011
Stanimir Atanasov, Bulgarian sprint canoer, born 1976
Teodor Atanasov (footballer), Bulgarian footballer, born 1987
Tsvetan Atanasov, Bulgarian football player, born 1948 
Valentin Atanasov, Bulgarian sprinter, born 1961
Zhivko Atanasov, Bulgarian footballer, born 1991

Bulgarian-language surnames